Fuaim Catha is an anarcho-punk album, by the band Oi Polloi. It was released in 1999 on Skuld Records. Fuaim Catha means 'Sound of Battle' in the Scottish Gaelic language.

Track listing
 The Earth Is Our Mother
 Terra-Ist
 Take Back The Land
 Religious Con
 Don't Burn The Witch
 The Right To Choose
 Fuck Everybody Who Voted Tory
 Sios Leis a' Ghniomhachas Mhoir
 G.L.F.
 Willie McRae
 Deathcafé
 Your Beer Is Shit And Your Money Stinks
 Sell-Out
 No More Roads
 Hunt The Rich
 Mindrot
 Anti-Police Aggro

1999 albums
Oi Polloi albums